A Dangerous Woman is a 1929 American Pre-Code film released by Paramount, based on the Margery Lawrence story, A Woman Who Needed Killing. It was directed by Gerald Grove and Rowland V. Lee from a script by John Farrow and Edward E. Paramore Jr.

Plot
Olga Baclanova (billed as Baclanova) stars as Tania Gregory and Clive Brook plays her husband Frank Gregory. The film is set at an outpost in British East Africa.

Cast
 Olga Baclanova as Tania Gregory
 Clive Brook as Frank Gregory 
 Neil Hamilton as Bobby Gregory
 Clyde Cook as Tubbs
 Leslie Fenton as Peter Allerton
 Snitz Edwards as Chief Macheria.

References

External links
 
 
 A Dangerous Woman, dvd

1929 films
1920s English-language films
1929 drama films
American black-and-white films
Paramount Pictures films
Films directed by Rowland V. Lee
1920s American films